Hamilcar Rashed Jr. (born January 2, 1998) is an American football outside linebacker for the Tampa Bay Buccaneers of the National Football League (NFL). He played college football at Oregon State.

Early years
Rashed Jr. originally attended Cesar Chavez High School in Phoenix, Arizona before transferring to Chandler High School in Chandler, Arizona for his senior season. He committed to Oregon State University to play college football.

College career
After redshirting his first year at Oregon State in 2016, Rashed Jr. played in all 12 games in 2017, recording six tackles. As a sophomore in 2018, he started 10 of 12 games, recording 58 tackles and 2.5 sacks. As a junior in 2019, he started 11 of 12 games, finishing with 62 tackles and school records 14 sacks and 22.5 tackles for loss. The tackles for loss also led the nation. He was named a first-team All-American by Sports Illustrated, The Athletic and Phil Steele.

Professional career

New York Jets
On May 3, 2021, Rashed signed with the New York Jets as an undrafted free agent. He was waived on August 31, 2021 and re-signed to the practice squad the next day. He signed a reserve/future contract with the Jets on January 10, 2022. On August 8, 2022, Rashed was waived.

Pittsburgh Steelers
On August 10, 2022, Rashed was claimed off waivers by the Pittsburgh Steelers. He was waived on August 30 and signed to the practice squad the next day. He was released on November 15, 2022.

Tampa Bay Buccaneers
On December 14, 2022, Rashed was signed to the Tampa Bay Buccaneers practice squad. He signed a reserve/future contract on January 17, 2023.

References

External links
Oregon State Beavers bio

1998 births
Living people
Players of American football from Phoenix, Arizona
American football linebackers
Oregon State Beavers football players
New York Jets players
Pittsburgh Steelers players
Tampa Bay Buccaneers players